The Second Fox Ministry was a responsible government which held power in New Zealand from July 1861 to August 1862. Although William Fox was the head of the government, he was never appointed Premier as that office had yet to be established. Instead, he was Attorney-General and then Colonial Secretary.

Background

The Second Fox Ministry took power after winning a motion of no confidence against Edward Stafford by two votes amid rising tensions with the Kingitanga movement. The new government survived another no-confidence motion a month later, surviving by reconstructing the Cabinet with the absence of Isaac Featherston and John Williamson – it had been argued by the Opposition that they were ineligible for office in the central government as they were both Provincial Superintendents. Even without the Superintendents, Fox's ministry was highly provincialist in policy, amending the New Provinces Act to prevent existing provinces from splintering into non-viable local entities.

The major crisis of New Zealand politics in the 1860s was the Māori question, with Fox leading the 'Peace Party' which was purported to prefer a non-violent resolution to the dispute with the Waikato iwi. This would involve incorporating Māori into Pākeha-style constitutional institutions such as local councils or Rūnanga. Previously, Māori policy had been reserved to the Governor, but now Governor Grey convinced the ministry to take on responsibility for this aspect of national politics. To Fox's surprise, the British government responded by giving notice that the New Zealand colonial government would have to fund their own military defences against Māori, while the Imperial troops would be withdrawn. 

This ultimatum had the impact of weakening the authority of the Fox Ministry, and Stafford was able to defeat the government in a no-confidence vote a year after Fox had taken office, although only by means of the Speaker's casting vote. Stafford declined to form a new government and Grey appointed Alfred Domett instead.

Ministers
The following members served in the Fox Ministry:

See also
 New Zealand Government

Notes

References

Ministries of Queen Victoria
Governments of New Zealand
19th century in New Zealand
1861 establishments in New Zealand
Cabinets established in 1861
Cabinets disestablished in 1862